The Defence of the Realm Act (DORA) was passed in the United Kingdom on 8 August 1914, four days after it entered the First World War and was added to as the war progressed. It gave the government wide-ranging powers during the war, such as the power to requisition buildings or land needed for the war effort, or to make regulations creating criminal offences.

DORA ushered in a variety of authoritarian social control mechanisms, such as censorship: "No person shall by word of mouth or in writing spread reports likely to cause disaffection or alarm among any of His Majesty's forces or among the civilian population" Anti-war activists, including John MacLean, Willie Gallacher, John William Muir, and Bertrand Russell, were sent to prison. The film, The Dop Doctor, was prohibited under the act by the South African government with the justification that its portrayal of Boers during the Siege of Mafeking would antagonise Afrikaners.

The trivial peacetime activities no longer permitted included flying kites, starting bonfires, buying binoculars, feeding wild animals bread, discussing naval and military matters or buying alcohol on public transport. Alcoholic drinks were watered down and pub opening times were restricted to 12pm–3pm and 6:30pm–9:30pm (the requirement for an afternoon gap in permitted hours lasted in England until the Licensing Act 1988).

In 1920 DORA was extended to deal with the violence in Ireland (see Irish War of Independence) with the Restoration of Order in Ireland Act 1920. That Act (under Section 3(6)) allowed military authorities to jail any Irish person without charge or trial and was repealed in 1953.

Intention 

Like most wartime acts, the Defence of the Realm Act was designed to help prevent potential invasion and to keep homeland morale at a high. It imposed censorship of journalism and of letters coming home from the front line. The press was subject to controls on reporting troop movements, numbers or any other operational information that would potentially be exploited by the Central Powers. People who breached the regulations with intent to assist the enemy or not would have been sentenced to death. 10 people were executed under the regulations.

The original Act, its amendment, and consolidation 
Section 1(1) of the Defence of the Realm Act read as follows:

The original Act was amended and extended six times over the course of the War, firstly on 28 August 1914 by the Defence of the Realm (No. 2) Act 1914, and on 27 November 1914 by the Defence of the Realm (Consolidation Act), 1914 (which repealed and replaced the previous Acts). It was amended three times in 1915, by the Defence of the Realm (Amendment) Acts, 1915 (5 Geo. 5, cc. 34, 37), and (5 & 6 Geo. 5, c. 42).

The Defence of the Realm (Consolidation Act), 1914 contained the following:

Similar legislation

See also 
 Munitions of War Act 1915

References

Further reading 
Digital reproduction of the Original Act from the Parliamentary Archives catalogue

External links 
 
 Hynes, Gregory: Defence of the Realm Act (DORA) , in: 1914-1918-online. International Encyclopedia of the First World War.
 Open Library - August 1918 edition of Defence of the Realm Manual

1914 in military history
Emergency laws in the United Kingdom
United Kingdom Acts of Parliament 1914
United Kingdom in World War I
United Kingdom military law
World War I legislation